"Evil & Flowers" was Bonnie Pink's third album released under the Pony Canyon label on April 17, 1998.

Track listing

Charts

Album

Singles

1998 albums
Bonnie Pink albums
Pony Canyon albums
Albums produced by Tore Johansson